Breitenfeld may refer to:

 Breitenfeld, Leipzig, a northwestern suburb (once an outlying village and crossroads  outside of Leipzig's curtain walls) on the plain of Leipzig, Germany 
 two battles that were fought there during the Thirty Years' war:
 Battle of Breitenfeld (1631)
 Battle of Breitenfeld (1642)
Breitenfeld, Saxony-Anhalt, a locality in the town Gardelegen in Saxony-Anhalt, Germany
Breitenfeld am Tannenriegel, a municipality in Styria, Austria
Breitenfeld an der Rittschein, a municipality in Styria, Austria

Breitenfelde 
or a spelling variant...
 Breitenfelde